The Comedians, Op. 26, is an orchestral suite of ten numbers by Dmitry Kabalevsky.  It is one of his best-known and best-loved works.

In particular, the "Comedians' Galop" (No. 2) is the single most famous piece of music he ever wrote. It is popular as a piece played on sports days in Japan.  (1942).

Background
In 1938 or 1939, Kabalevsky wrote incidental music for a children's play called The Inventor and the Comedians, by the Soviet Jewish writer Mark Daniel.  The play was staged at the Central Children's Theatre in Moscow, and it was about the German inventor Johannes Gutenberg and a group of travelling buffoons.  Mark Daniel died young the following year.

Concert suite
In 1940, Kabalevsky chose ten short numbers from the incidental music and arranged them into a concert suite.  The movements are:
 Prologue: Allegro vivace
 Comedians' Galop: Presto
 March: Moderato
 Waltz: Moderato
 Pantomime: Sostenuto e pesante
 Intermezzo: Allegro scherzando
 Little Lyrical Scene: Andantino semplice
 Gavotte: Allegretto
 Scherzo: Presto assai e molto leggiero
 Epilogue: Allegro molto e con brio.

The Comedians has been frequently recorded.

The "Galop" was used as the theme tune for the U.S. panel game show Masquerade Party for many years.

References

Incidental music
Orchestral suites
Compositions for symphony orchestra
Compositions by Dmitry Kabalevsky
1938 compositions
1940 compositions
Humor in classical music